Cirque Peak is a peak  south of Le Couteur Peak, in the Millen Range, Victoria Land, Antarctica. The topographical feature was so named by the Northern Party of the New Zealand Federated Mountain Clubs Antarctic Expedition (NZFMCAE), 1962–63, due to the peak's position at the head of a large cirque containing a section of the Pearl Harbor Glacier névé. The peak lies situated on the Pennell Coast, a portion of Antarctica lying between Cape Williams and Cape Adare.

References 

Mountains of Victoria Land
Pennell Coast